The 2010-11 Austrian Football First League (German: Erste Liga, also known as ADEG Erste Liga due to sponsorship) was the 37th season of the Austrian second-level football league. It began on 14 July 2010 and ended on 28 May 2011.

The size of the league was reduced from twelve to ten teams for this season after a reform of the second- and third-level tiers of the Austrian football league pyramid. Reserve teams from Bundesliga clubs were excluded from competing in the First League, and relegation/promotion playoffs between the ninth-placed First League team and the two Regionalliga champions missing out on direct promotion were introduced.

Teams
Wacker Innsbruck as 2009–10 First League champions were promoted to the 2010–11 Bundesliga. Wacker were originally to be replaced by SK Austria Kärnten, who finished the 2009–10 Bundesliga season in last place; however, Kärnten were not awarded a professional licence by the Bundesliga licensing board and hence relegated to the Austrian Regionalliga.

As part of the reform of the Austrian second and third levels, the reserve teams of Bundesliga clubs Red Bull Salzburg and Austria Vienna were both relegated to the Regionaliga at the end of the 2009–10 season. They were joined by Dornbirn 1913, who finished the 2009–10 season in last place of the league table and hence were relegated as well.

Due to the decreased size of the league, only two teams from the Regionalliga were promoted. WAC St. Andrä as winners of the promotion playoff between the three Regionalliga champions were directly promoted, while SV Grödig were scheduled to play in another playoff against 9th-placed First League team First Vienna FC. The playoff was then cancelled and Grödig directly admitted to the First League after Austria Kärnten were denied their professional licence.

League table

See also
 2010–11 Austrian Football Bundesliga
 2010–11 Austrian Cup

External links
 Official site
 soccerway.com

2. Liga (Austria) seasons
Austria
2010–11 in Austrian football